The Unellez Botanical Garden Is a botanical garden and a zoo of 14 ha of extension, located inside the facilities of the National Experimental University of the Llanos Ezequiel Zamora in Barinas, Venezuela. It is a member of the BGCI, being its international identification code as a botanical institution as well as s
It is located to the northwest of the city of Barinas, at the foot of the Mountain range of the $ andes; To a height of 200 msnm and presenting an average annual temperature of 28 °C.

It was created in 1979, This garden also includes a zoo with an area of 14 hectares of which 4 ha correspond to a lagoon

The collections of plants of the botanical garden, are grouped like:

Arboretum (34 spp.)
Plants of economic interest (50 spp.)
Plants of medicinal interest
Fodder plants
Palmetum (13 spp.)
Ornamental plants (100 spp.)
There is a germplasm bank with a mean conservation capacity that contains 84 accessions, representing 73 species (1994 figures).

See also
Naguanagua Botanical Garden
Caracas Botanical Garden

References

Botanical gardens in Venezuela
Protected areas established in 1979
Zoos in Venezuela